Zero gravity refers to weightlessness.

Zero gravity may also refer to:

Aerospace
Zero Gravity Corporation, a company operating weightless flights
Zero Gravity Paragliders, a South Korean aircraft manufacturer
Zero Gravity Flow, a South Korean paraglider design
Zero Gravity Windstar, a South Korean paraglider design
Zero Gravity Pen or Space Pen, a brand of pen that uses pressurized ink cartridges
Zero gravity toilet or space toilet, a toilet that can be used in a low-gravity environment

Groups and organizations
ZeroGravity (stunt team)
Zero Gravity Entertainment, a videogame studio; see Index of DOS games (X)

Fictional groups
Zero Gravity, a fictional English hard rock band in the television series Drake & Josh

Entertainment
Sonic Riders: Zero Gravity, a video game
"Zero Gravity", an episode of the TV show The Big World of Little Adam
Wayne Shorter: Zero Gravity, a 2015 documentary about saxophonist Wayne Shorter
 Z-G (Zero Gravity), a collectible action figure game

Music
"Zero Gravity" (Kerli song), 2012 song by Kerli
"Zero Gravity" (Kate Miller-Heidke song), 2019 song that will represent Australia in the Eurovision Song Contest 2019
Zero Gravity II, a 2014 mixtape by Los
Zero Gravity I, a 2010 mixtape by Los (rapper)
"Zero Gravity", 2004 song by Blank & Jones from the album Monument (Blank & Jones album)
"Zero Gravity", 2009 song by Perfume from the album Triangle (Perfume album)
"Zero Gravity", 2009 song by David Archuleta
"Zero Gravity", 2015 song by Borgeous
"Zero Gravity", 2015 single by Jean Michel Jarre with Tangerine Dream from the album Electronica 1: The Time Machine
"Zero Gravity", 2016 song by ZERO-G; see List of Billboard China V Chart number-one videos of 2016
"0-GRAVITY", 2012 song by Granrodeo off the album Crack Star Flash

Other uses
 A1 Zero Gravity Championship], a pro-wrestling championship from A1 (Alpha-1) wrestling promotion
 Zero Gravity Amusement Park, Dallas, Texas, USA

See also

microgravity
"Zero Gravity Zone", an episode of the television series Code Lyoko
"Gravity Zero Gravity", a 2007 song by Shonen Knife off the album Fun! Fun! Fun!
zero-gravity roll on roller coasters

Zero-G (disambiguation)
Gravity Zero (disambiguation)